Gunslinger is a Western television series starring Tony Young that aired on the CBS television network from February 9 until May 18, 1961 on Thursdays from  9 to 10 p.m. EST. The series theme song was sung by Frankie Laine.

Young played Cord, a young gunfighter who works undercover for the local army garrison commander, acting as a secret law enforcement agent in the territory. The series lasted for only twelve episodes.

Gunslinger was the successor to Dick Powell's Zane Grey Theater.

Cast
 Tony Young as Cord
 Preston Foster as Captain Zachary Wingate
 Charles Gray as Pico McGuire
 Dee Pollock as Billy Urchin
 Midge Ware as Amby Hollister
 John M. Pickard as Sgt. Major Murdock

Guest stars

 Roy Barcroft
 Henry Brandon
 Anthony Caruso
 Phyllis Coates
 Lloyd Corrigan
 Royal Dano
 Jim Davis
 Buddy Ebsen
 Jack Elam
 Gene Evans
 Jock Gaynor
 Raymond Guth
 Ron Hagerthy
 Don C. Harvey
 Myron Healey
 Anne Helm
 John Hoyt

 George Kennedy
 Sandy Kenyon
 Norman Leavitt
 Celia Lovsky
 Barbara Luna
 Jock Mahoney
 Stafford Repp
 Addison Richards
 William Schallert
 Jay Silverheels
 Quentin Sondergaard
 Fay Spain
 Harry Dean Stanton
 William Tannen
 Vaughn Taylor
 Guy Teague
 Rick Vallin

References

Bibliography 
 McNeil, Alex. Total Television (1996). New York: Penguin Books 
 Brooks, Tim and Marsh, Earle, The Complete Directory to Prime Time Network and Cable TV Shows (1999). New York: Ballantine Books

External links
 

1960s Western (genre) television series
CBS original programming
1961 American television series debuts
1961 American television series endings
Black-and-white American television shows